"Ave Crux Alba" is the national anthem of the Sovereign Military Order of Malta. The anthem was composed in 1930 by Alfredo Consorti.

Lyrics

Notes

References

External links
 Ave Crux Alba at nationalanthems.info, with lyrics and recording
 An instrumental rendition performed by the Slovak State Philharmonic Orchestra and conducted by Peter Breiner - Youtube

European anthems
National anthems
Sovereign Military Order of Malta
Song articles with missing songwriters
Year of song missing